Ho is a Munda language of the Austroasiatic language family spoken primarily in India by about 1.04 million people (0.103% of India's population) per the 2001 census. Ho is a tribal language. It is spoken by the Ho, Munda, Kolha and Kol tribal communities of Odisha, Jharkhand, Bihar, Chhattisgarh, West Bengal, Assam and is written with the Warang Citi script. Devanagari, Latin script, Odia script and Telugu script are sometimes used, although native speakers are said to prefer a Ho script. The latter script was invented by Ott Guru Kol Lako Bodra.

The name "Ho" is derived from the native word "" which means "Human being".

Distribution
Around half of all Ho speakers are from West Singhbhum district of Jharkhand, where they form the majority community. Ho speakers are also found in East Singhbhum district in southern Jharkhand and in northern Odisha. Ho is closer to the Mayurbhanj dialect of Mundari than the language spoken in Jharkhand. Ho and Mundari are ethnically and linguistically close but the regional identity of the speakers is distinct. Some researchers and scholars state that Ho and Mundari are two sister languages.

Stages of development
The lexicon of the language reflects close association with nature and living proximity with birds and beasts which is typical for tribal languages.

The Roman, Devanagari and Warang Citi scripts have been used in the field of teaching and learning. In 1953, the department of Education, Government of Bihar set out instructions to all the Divisional Inspectors of schools. The government maintained that ‘the pupil-teachers whose mother tongue is other than Hindi should be given the option of maintaining their records in their mother tongue. In every junior Training School besides Hindi, a second mother-tongue as accepted in Government resolution no.645ER of 10 August 1953 should be invariably taught.’ The plan has been to provide education in their mother tongue at the primary level.

Since 1976, the Ho language is being imparted at intermediate and graduate courses in different colleges under the Ranchi University. The university opened a separate department named Tribal and Regional Languages in 1981.

In erstwhile Bihar, the Information and Mass Communication department regularly published Ho articles, folk stories, songs in devanagari script in a weekly named Adivasi Saptahik. The Tribal Research Institute conducted a Study of Ho Dialect.

There are significant initiatives inculcated in development of Ho language. A pioneering work was started at Ete Turtung Akhara, Jhinkapani to study and develop the Ho language under the leadership of late Lako Bodra with the help of Adi Sanskriti evam Vigyan Sansthan. The institute published a book in 1963 entitled Ho Hayam Paham Puti in the Barang Chiti lipi script and introduced the letters of Barang Chiti, Kakahara.

Sindhu Surin reworked and propagated Owar Ankawa- a reformed script of barang chiti. This has been popularized and disseminated by the institution called Sindhu Jumur.

A.Pathak and N.K. Verma tried to compare the Warang Chiti lipi with the script of Indus valley in their book the Echoes of Indus valley. Sudhanshu Kumar Ray in his ‘Indus Script’ described that the script Barang Chiti resembles the script of Indus that was discovered by Ashok Pagal and Bulu Imam in the caves of Aswara hill near Baraka village.

Xavier Ho Publication, Lupungutu has been publishing a series of books in Devanagri script. Fr. John Deeney wrote Ho Grammar and Vocabulary in 1975.

4. Change of Status/Course due to important event like linguistic states reorganization: In post-independence era by state reorganization, Ho speaking region bifurcated and demography scattered into Bihar, Orissa and West Bengal. Post independence state reorganization, therefore, was of little help in the development of Ho language.

A new state Jharkhand came into existence in November 2000. In its effort the state government has recently recommended Ho language to be included in the eighth schedule of the Constitution. There is hope in the initiative taken by the government as regard to the development of the Ho language in future.

Rising significance of Ho language and UGC-NET
The University Grants Commission of India has already recognized Ho as a language and literature. Now, UGC is conducting National Eligibility Test examination in Ho language under the "'subject code 70"' in Tribal and Regional Language/Literature group. In Odisha and Jharkhand, Education in Ho at the primary level was introduced in 20 and 449 schools respectively and about 44,502 tribal students are pursuing their studies in the language.

Besides education, Ho has also got its due recognition in the world of mass media. For the last few years, All India Radio (AIR) has been airing songs in Ho from the AIR centres in Keonjhar, Rourkela and Cuttack besides Baripada in Mayurbhanj district of Odisha state. Regular programs in Ho are broadcast from Chaibasa and Jamshedpur AIR centres in Jharkhand. Similarly, from Ranchi AIR centre in Jharkhand, regional news bulletins are broadcast two days a week Friday and Sunday.

Demand for inclusion in the Eighth Schedule to the Constitution

Odisha government and Jharkhand government has been continuously making demands of HO language for inclusion in Eighth Schedule to the Constitution of India. Ho peoples are also making continuous efforts to fulfill their demands as to be included in 8th scheduled. BJP Rajya Sabha MP and Union petroleum and steel minister Dharmendra Pradhan has also submitted a memorandum demanding that the government of India to include Ho in the Constitution to give it an official status .The same request has also been made by the Department of personnel, Jharkhand. Former Home minister Rajnath singh also assured for Ho language to be included in 8th scheduled of constitution and Minister Rajnath Singh assured to take appropriates steps to fulfil the demand, said union minister Dharmendra Pradhan.

Employment opportunities in Ho languages

The students who are enrolling in Ho language which has been provided by Ranchi University, Ranchi and Kolhan university, Chaibasa are getting jobs in archaeological centres and works as translator. After passing class XII, the students can pursue UG Course in Ho language in Ranchi university, Ranchi. Similarly, Odisha government has also been providing education to Ho tribal students in Ho language called as Multi-lingual education system and the tribal youths are getting jobs as teacher in Ho language and earning good salaries for multilingual education of odisha.

Institutes and universities for Ho language

Universities
 Ranchi University, Ranchi, Jharkhand
 Kolhan University, Chaibasa, Jharkhand

Colleges
 Ho Language Education Council, Thakurmunda, Mayurbhanj, Odisha
 Ho Language +2 Junior College, Thakurmunda, Mayurbhanj, Odisha

Institutes and schools
 Kolguru Lako Bodra Ho Language High school, Birbasa, Bhubaneswar, Odisha
 Banajyoti Bahubhasi Vidya Mandir, Purunapai, Deogorh, Odisha
 Veer Birsa Warangchity Mondo, Rairangpur, Mayurbhanj, Odisha
 Birsa Munda Ho Language High school, Jamunalia, Keonjhar, Odisha
 Padmashree Tulasi Munda Ho Language High School, Machhgorh, Keonjhar, Odisha
 Kol guru Lako Bodra Ho Language High School, Dobati, Balasore, Odisha
 Birsa Munda Ho Language High School, Nuagaon, Mayurbhanj, Odisha
 Atteh Turtung Rumtulay mondo, singda, Mayurbhanj, Odisha
 Bankipirh Marshal Mondo, Bankidihi, Mayurbhanj, Odisha
 Similipal Baa bagan mondo, Thakurmapatna, Mayurbhanj, Odisha
 Kolguru Lako Bodra Ho Language High School, Gokul Chandra pur, Mayurbhanj, Odisha
 Birsa Munda Ho Language High School, Hadagutu, Mayurbhanj, Odisha
 Kolhan High School, Satakosia, Mayurbhanj, Odisha
 Guru Lako Bodra Ho Language High School, Thakurmunda, Mayurbhanj, Odisha
 Ho Hayam Seyannoh Moond,Madkamhatu,Mayurbhanj, Odisha
 Sitadevi Warangchity Moond,Khunta,Mayurbhanj, Odisha
 P.C.Haibru Warangchity School,Kadadiha,Mayurbhanj, Odisha

Ho folk literature

 Ho folk literature's collection of folk songs by Sharatchandra Rai, Dr. D.N. Majumdar, B. Sukumar, Haldhaar, Kanhuram Devgum etc. (1915–26).
 Tuturd, Sayan Marsal by Dr. S.K. Tiyu.
 The Affairs of a Tribe by Dr. D.N. Majumdaar.
 Aandi and Sarjom Ba Dumba by Jaidev Das.
 Ho Durandh by W.G. Archer.
 Folklore of Kolhaan by C.H. Bompaas.
 Sengail (Poems), Satish Rumul (Poems), Ho Chapakarh Kahin, Satish Chandra Sanhita, and Chaas Raiy Takh by Satish Kumar Koda.
 Dishum Rumul Mage Durudh by Shivcharan Birua.
 Adivasi Sivil Durang, Adivasi Deyoan, Adivasi Muni and Urri Keda Kova Red-Ranu by Durga Purti.
 Bonga Buru Ko (Ho Religion), Horoh Hoan Ko, Maradh Bonga, and Gosain-Devgum Mage Poraab (on Maage Parv) by Pradhaan Gaagrai.
 Warangchity (on Ho Lipi), Pompo, Shaar Hora 1-7(Play), Raghuvansh (Play),Kol ruul(Hindi and Ho(warangchity),Homoyom pitika, Hora-Bara, Ho Hayam paam puti,Halang halpung,Ela ol itu ute, Jiboan * * Gumpai Durang,Baa bur Wonga buru and Bonga Singirai (Novel) by otguru kol Lako Bodra.
 Ho Kudih (Novel) by Dumbi Ho.
 Ho Kudih (Novel) and Adhunik Ho Shishth Kawya by Prof. Janum Singh Soy.
 Jaira Jeebon Dastur, Durrn Dudugar, and Ho Bhasha Shastra Ayun Vyakaran by Prof. Balram Paat Pingua.
 Ho Dishum Ho Hoon Ko by Dhanusingh Purti.
 Eitaa Bataa Nalaa Basaa, Joaur, Parem Sanadh (Poems), Sarjom Ba Taral, etc. By Kamal Lochan Kohaar.
 Ho Lokkatha by Dr. Aditya Prasad Sinha.
 Magazines like Johar, Turturd, Ottoroad, and Sarnaphool also have Ho language articles.
 HO Language Digital Journal "Diyang"
Ho Language monthly journal"Dostur Korang"by Kairasingh Bandiya
 HO Kaboy (Poem) poti "Tangi Meyanj Sorogo Kore" by Ghanshyam Bodra
Ho language song"Dureng Dala"by Dibakar Soy
Ho language learning books "Ol initu" and "Mage Porob"by Kairasingh Bandiya"
Ho hayam sibil dureng(Ho and Hindi) by Doboro Buliuli

Further reading
 Grammar of the Kol by Ray A. Nariroat.
 Encyclopaedia Mundarica by John-Baptist Hoffmann has a section on 'Ho Dictionary'.
 Ho Grammar and Vocabulary, Ho-English Dictionary, and Ho Sahitya Sarjan by Father John J. Deeney S.J.
 Deeney, J. J. (1991). Introduction to the Ho language: [learn Ho quickly and well]. Chaibasa: Xavier Ho Publications.
 Burrows, L. (1915). Ho grammar: with vocabulary.
 Deeney, J. J. (1975). Ho grammar and vocabulary. Chaibasa: Xavier Ho Publications.
 Deogam, Chandrabhusan, "Larka Ho", by Chandrabhusan Deogam.
 Uxbond, F.A., "Munda-Magyar-Maori". by F.A.Uxbond.london lUZAC & CO. 46, GREAT RUSSELL STREET.(1928).
 Deeney, J. J. (1978). Ho-English Dictionary. Chaibasa: Xavier Ho Publications.
 Anderson, Gregory D. S., Toshiki Osada and K. David Harrison. Ho and the other Kherwarian Languages In Gregory Anderson (ed.) Munda Languages. (2008). Routledge. 
 Perumalsamy P (2021) "Ho language" in Linguistic Survey of India: Jharkhand, Language Division, Office of the Registrar General India, New Delhi

See also
 Languages of India
 Languages with official status in India

References

External links
The Ho language webpage by K. David Harrison, Swarthmore College
RWAAI | RWAAI, Lunds universitet RWAAI (Repository and Workspace for Austroasiatic Intangible Heritage)

 
Munda languages
Endangered languages of India
Languages of Jharkhand
Languages of Odisha